Candy Toxton (November 12, 1925 – December 28, 2005) was an American actress, died age 80.

Early life
She was born Florence Tockstein on November 12, 1925 in Vienna, Missouri, the eldest of six children of Edward and Teresa Tockstein.

Personal life
She was married to the jazz singer Mel Tormé from February 1949 until their divorce in 1955. They had two children, including the entertainer Steve March-Tormé. Toxton later married the comedian and actor Hal March.

Filmography
Julia Misbehaves (1948) as Girl in Hotel Lobby (uncredited)
Moonrise (1948) as Minor Role (uncredited)
The Kissing Bandit (1948) as Bit Role (uncredited)
Words and Music (1948) as Showgirl (uncredited)
Act of Violence (1949) as Veteran's Wife (uncredited)
Knock on Any Door (1949) as Adele Morton (final film role) (credited as Susan Perry)

References

1925 births
2005 deaths
People from Vienna, Missouri
Actresses from Missouri
20th-century American women
20th-century American people
21st-century American women